Sari Maritza (born Dora Patricia Detring-Nathan; 17 March 1910 – July 1987) was a British film actress of the early 1930s.

Early years 
Born Dora Patricia Detring-Nathan in Tianjin, China, Maritza was the daughter of Major Walter Simeon Nathan, an army engineer who was an agent and manager in Chinese Mining and Engineering,  and his Viennese wife. Her stage name was taken from the titles of two then famous European operettas – Sari and Countess Maritza. British colonial administrator Matthew Nathan was her uncle.

Film 

Maritza entered films in 1930 and gained some notoriety for dancing a tango with Charles Chaplin at the premiere for his film City Lights in 1931. Although her behaviour was described as lurid, which was silly publicity, she attracted attention and was cast in several low budget, but relatively popular British films.

She made the German-UK film Monte Carlo Madness in Germany in 1932 before traveling to Hollywood, but her few films there for Paramount Studios and RKO Radio Pictures were poorly received.

In America, she was portrayed as an exotic European vamp with emphasis placed on her mother's Austrian heritage, but Maritza had lived most of her life in Britain, and disapproved of the studio's attempts to create a more mysterious facade for her. She retired in 1934 following her marriage, and in later years, admitted that she had been eager to end her career as she did not consider herself to be a capable actress.

The Literary Digest said the name was pronounced SHA-ree MAR-ee-tsa. (Charles Earle Funk, What's the Name, Please?, Funk & Wagnalls, 1936.)

Personal life and death 
On October 17, 1934, Maritza married film executive Sam Katz in Phoenix, Arizona. They divorced in 1938. She died at age 77 in the U.S. Virgin Islands in July 1987.

Filmography
 Greek Street (UK, 1930) as Anna
 Bed and Breakfast (UK, 1930) as Anne Entwhistle
 No Lady (UK, 1931) as Greta Gherkinski
 The Water Gipsies (UK, 1932) as Lily Bell
 Monte Carlo Madness (Germany/UK, 1932) as Queen Yola
 Forgotten Commandments (Paramount, 1932) as Anya Sorina
 Evenings for Sale (Paramount, 1932) (with Herbert Marshall, Charlie Ruggles, and Mary Boland) as Lela Fischer
 A Lady's Profession (Paramount, 1933) as Cecily Withers
 International House (Paramount, 1933) (with W. C. Fields, Bela Lugosi, George Burns, and Gracie Allen) as Carol Fortescue
 The Right to Romance (RKO, 1933) (with Ann Harding, Robert Young, and Nils Asther) as Lee Joyce
Her Secret (1933) as Waffles
 Crimson Romance (Mascot, 1934) as Alida Hoffman (final film role)

References

External links

1910 births
1987 deaths
English film actresses
20th-century English actresses
Actresses from Tianjin
English people of Austrian descent
British expatriates in China